Squalius orpheus, also known as the Orpheus dace,  is a cyprinid fish endemic to the  Maritsa drainage in Greece, Bulgaria, North Macedonia, Serbia, and  Turkey.

References

Squalius
Fish described in 2006